James Everett (14 February 1890 – 18 December 1967) was an Irish Labour Party politician who served as Minister for Justice from 1954 to 1957, Minister for Posts and Telegraphs from 1948 to 1951 and Leader of the National Labour Party from 1944 to 1950. He served as a Teachta Dála (TD) from 1922 to 1967.

He was leader of the short-lived National Labour Party, which briefly split away from the Labour Party over a dispute relating to support for James Larkin as a candidate in Dublin.

Career
On leaving school Everett became an organiser with County Wicklow Agricultural Union, which later merged with the ITGWU. He was a member of Sinn Féin and served as a justice in the Republican courts for Kildare and Wicklow from 1919. He was first elected to Dáil Éireann in 1922 as a Labour Party TD for Kildare–Wicklow constituency. From the 1923 general election until his death, he was elected for the Wicklow. Everett was one of the six TDs who left the Labour Party in 1944, because of its alleged infiltration by communists, and formed the National Labour Party. Everett became the leader of the new party.

In 1948, the National Labour Party joined the Cabinet of John A. Costello in the First Inter-Party Government and Everett was appointed Minister for Posts and Telegraphs. In 1950, Everett, as Minister for Posts and Telegraphs became involved in a bizarre incident known as the "Battle of Baltinglass." Everett appointed Michael Farrell as sub-postmaster in the local post office. The office had been run by Helen Cooke for her invalid aunt, whose family had held the position since 1870. Local feeling ran high in support of Cooke, with telegraph poles being cut to prove their point. Allegations of political jobbery were denied but Everett's actions became a national issue. Farrell resigned in December 1950 and Everett bowed to the pressure and appointed Cooke. It is believed that the Baltinglass affair contributed to the downfall of the Inter-Party government in 1951.

Also in 1950, during the First Inter-Party Government's tenure, the Labour Party and the National Labour Party reunited. Everett served in government again between 1954 and 1957 as Minister for Justice and in that capacity he granted Albert Luykx Irish citizenship. Everett died aged 77, during the 1967 Dáil Christmas Recess, when with 44 years service as a TD, he was joint Father of the Dáil with Frank Aiken and Paddy Smith.

References

External links

 

1890 births
1967 deaths
Local councillors in County Wicklow
Labour Party (Ireland) TDs
National Labour Party (Ireland) TDs
Members of the 3rd Dáil
Members of the 4th Dáil
Members of the 5th Dáil
Members of the 6th Dáil
Members of the 7th Dáil
Members of the 8th Dáil
Members of the 9th Dáil
Members of the 10th Dáil
Members of the 11th Dáil
Members of the 12th Dáil
Members of the 13th Dáil
Members of the 14th Dáil
Members of the 15th Dáil
Members of the 16th Dáil
Members of the 17th Dáil
Members of the 18th Dáil
Ministers for Justice (Ireland)
People of the Irish Civil War (Pro-Treaty side)
Politicians from County Wicklow